Khizr Khan (reigned 28 May 1414 – 20 May 1421) was the founder of the Sayyid dynasty, the ruling dynasty of the Delhi sultanate, in northern India soon after the invasion of Timur and the fall of the Tughlaq dynasty.
Khizr Khan was Governor of Multan under the Tughlaq ruler, Firuz Shah Tughlaq, and was known to be an able administrator. He did not take up any royal title due to fear of Amir Timur (better known historically as Tamerlane) and contended himself with the titles of Rayat-i-Ala (Sublime Banners) and Masnad-i-Aali or (Most High Post). During his reign, coins were continued to be struck in the name of previous Tughlaq rulers. After his death on 20 May 1421, he was succeeded by his son Mubarak Khan, who took the title of Muizz-ud-Din Mubarak Shah.

Ancestry and early life
A contemporary writer Yahya Sirhindi mentions in his Takhrikh-i-Mubarak Shahi that Khizr Khan was a descendant of prophet Muhammad. Members of the dynasty derived their title, Sayyid, or the descendants of the Islamic prophet, Muhammad, based on the claim that they belonged to his lineage through his daughter Fatima. However, Yahya Sirhindi based his conclusions on unsubstantial evidence, the first being a casual recognition by the famous saint Sayyid Jalaluddin Bukhari of Uch Sharif of his Sayyid heritage, and secondly the noble character of the Sultan which distinguished him as a Prophet's descendant. Abraham Eraly is of the opinion that Khizr Khan ancestors were likely to have been Arabs who settled in region of Multan under the rule of Tughluq dynasty. But according to Richard M. Eaton, Khizr Khan was a Punjabi chieftain belonging to the Khokhar clan, who travelled to Samarkand and profited from the contacts he made with the Timurid society. Khizr Khan's native town was Fathpur in Punjab (present-day Pakistan) which also served as his capital before he conquered Delhi in 1414.

Reign
After his accession to the throne, Khizr Khan appointed Malik-us-Sharq Tuhfa as his wazir and he was given the title of Taj-ul-Mulk and he remained in office until 1421. The fiefs of Muzaffarnagar and Saharanpur were given to Sayyid Salim. Abdur Rahman received the fiefs of Multan and Fatehpur. In 1414, an army led by Taj-ul-Mulk was sent to suppress the rebellion of Har Singh, the Raja of Katehar. Raja fled to the forests but finally was compelled to surrender and agree to pay tributes in future. In July, 1416 an army led by Taj-ul-Mulk was sent to Bayana and Gwalior where it plundered the peasants in the name of realizing the amount equivalent to the tributes to be paid and also annexed both the regions. In 1417, Khizr Khan obtained permission from Shah Rukh to have his own name also suffixed to that of Shah Rukh. In 1418, Har Singh revolted again but was defeated completely by Taj-ul-Mulk. On May 28, 1414, Khizr Khan Captured Delhi and imprisoned Daulat Khan Lodi.

References

Further reading

Muntakhab-ul Lubab, Muḥammad Hāshim Khāfī Khān, Sir Henry Miers Elliot, John Dowson, 2006.

Sayyid dynasty
Sultans of Delhi
15th-century Indian Muslims
15th-century Indian monarchs